Major General Cheryl Ann Pearce,  is a deputy commissioner in the Australian Border Force and a retired senior officer of the Australian Army. She graduated from the Officer Cadet School, Portsea and was commissioned into the Royal Australian Corps of Military Police in 1985. She has commanded the Defence Police Training Centre (2003), 1st Military Police Battalion (2006–08), Task Group Afghanistan (2016) and Australian Defence Force Academy (2017–18), and has served on operations in East Timor and Afghanistan. She was Force Commander, United Nations Peacekeeping Force in Cyprus from January 2019 to January 2021 and, following her retirement from the Australian Army, was appointed Deputy Commissioner Ports and Enforcement in the Australian Border Force in August 2021.

Military career
Pearce graduated from the Officer Cadet School, Portsea and was commissioned into the Royal Australian Corps of Military Police in December 1985. Her early career featured a range of regimental and staff appointments, including postings to Headquarters 1st Brigade, to the G3 (operations) branch at Land Headquarters, and as staff officer to the commandant of the Australian Defence Force Academy. She graduated from the Australian Command and Staff College in 2001 and, in 2002, deployed as a military observer with the United Nations Mission of Support to East Timor, for which she was awarded a Chief of the Defence Force Commendation.

Following her return to Australia, Pearce was appointed to command the Defence Police Training Centre in 2003. She was next posted as Provost Marshal – Army, prior to assuming command of the 1st Military Police Battalion from 2004 to 2006. In recognition of her "exceptional service" in these three positions, Pearce was appointed a Member of the Order of Australia in the 2007 Australia Day Honours. Pearce was subsequently posted to the directing staff of the Australian Command and Staff College, served as Director Network Centric Warfare in the Capability Development Group, and served as Director Special Operations Support from 2010 to 2012. She attended the Higher Command and Staff Course in the United Kingdom in 2013 and, on her return to Australia, was appointed chief of staff at Headquarters Australian Army from 2013 to 2016.

In 2016, Pearce deployed to the Middle East as commander of Task Group Afghanistan. The task group, as part of Australia's contribution to NATO's Resolute Support Mission, provided training and advice to the Afghan National Security Forces. Pearce's "distinguished performance" during the nine-month deployment was recognised with the award of the Commendation for Distinguished Service in the 2018 Queen's Birthday Honours. Pearce was subsequently appointed commandant of the Australian Defence Force Academy from 2017 to 2018. In November 2018, the Secretary-General of the United Nations, António Guterres, announced that Pearce had been selected to succeed Major General Mohammad Humayun Kabir as Force Commander of the United Nations Peacekeeping Force in Cyprus (UNFICYP). Pearce, who assumed command of UNFICYP in January 2019, is the second woman to be appointed force commander of a United Nations mission. As force commander, she was responsible for more than 800 personnel from 15 nations working to maintain peace and stability in Cyprus, in spite of the additional challenges posed by the COVID-19 pandemic. Pearce relinquished command of UNFICYP on 4 January 2021 and, for her "outstanding achievement" in the role, she was awarded the Conspicuous Service Cross in the 2022 Australia Day Honours.

Border Force
Pearce retired from the Australian Army shortly following her return from Cyprus and, on 30 August 2021, she was appointed Deputy Commissioner Ports and Enforcement in the Australian Border Force.

Personal life and education
Pearce was born in Loxton, South Australia. She has a partner, Paul, and two daughters.

Pearce holds a Bachelor of Arts in Asian Studies from the University of New England, a Graduate Diploma of Management in Defence Studies from the University of Canberra, a Master of Intelligence, Policing and Counter Terrorism from Macquarie University, and a Master of Arts in Defence Studies from Deakin University.

References

Australian generals
Military personnel from South Australia
Australian military personnel of the War in Afghanistan (2001–2021)
Deakin University alumni
Graduates of the Officer Cadet School, Portsea
Living people
Macquarie University alumni
Members of the Order of Australia
People from Loxton, South Australia
Recipients of the Commendation for Distinguished Service
Recipients of the Conspicuous Service Cross (Australia)
University of Canberra alumni
University of New England (Australia) alumni
Year of birth missing (living people)